Abia sericea, common name club horned sawfly or scabious sawfly, is a species of sawflies belonging to the family Cimbicidae.

Distribution and habitat
This species can be found in most of European countries. It mainly occurs in wet meadows and forests, but its narrow habitat is restricted to the range of its host plant.

Description
The adults have a large body with a showy metallic green-golden or bronze abdomen. The thorax is black, with bluish sheen and it is slightly hairy. Wings are transparent, with brown markings in the middle. Antennae are yellow-reddish, while other species in this genus have totally or partially black antennae. Legs are yellow, with black thighs at their base.

Biology
Adults can be seen from May to October feeding on nectar of Devil's-bit Scabious (Succisa pratensis), of Ferulago galbanifera (syn. F. campestris) and of the giant fennel (Ferula communis).

They have a sandy background colour with black and yellow spots. They are oligophagous, mainly feeding between June and September on Devil's-bit Scabious (Succisa pratensis), Field Scabious (Knautia arvensis), cream scabious (Scabiosa ochroleuca ) and on various Dipsacus species.

References

External links
 Image of larva on Flickriver
 Galerie-insecte.org

Tenthredinoidea
Hymenoptera of Europe
Insects described in 1767
Taxa named by Carl Linnaeus